The Songs of Bilitis is a collection of erotic, essentially lesbian, poetry by Pierre Louÿs published in Paris in 1894. Since Louÿs claimed that he had translated the original poetry from Ancient Greek, this work is considered a pseudotranslation. The poems were actually clever fabulations, authored by Louÿs himself, and are still considered important literature.

The poems are in the manner of Sappho; the collection's introduction claims they were found on the walls of a tomb in Cyprus, written by a woman of Ancient Greece called Bilitis, a courtesan and contemporary of Sappho to whose life Louÿs dedicated a small section of the book. On publication, the volume deceived even expert scholars.

Louÿs claimed the 143 prose poems, excluding 3 epitaphs, were entirely the work of this ancient poet—a place where she poured both her most intimate thoughts and most public actions, from childhood innocence in Pamphylia to the loneliness and chagrin of her later years.

Although for the most part The Songs of Bilitis is original work, many of the poems were reworked epigrams from the Palatine Anthology, and Louÿs even borrowed some verses from Sappho herself. The poems are a blend of mellow sensuality and polished style in the manner of Parnassianism, but underneath run subtle Gallic undertones that Louÿs could never escape.

To lend authenticity to the forgery, Louÿs in the index listed some poems as "untranslated"; he even craftily fabricated an entire section of his book called "The Life of Bilitis", crediting a certain fictional archaeologist Herr G. Heim ("Mr. C. Cret" in German) as the discoverer of Bilitis' tomb. And though Louÿs displayed great knowledge of Ancient Greek culture, ranging from children's games in "Tortie Tortue" to application of scents in "Perfumes", the literary fraud was eventually exposed. This did little, however, to taint their literary value in readers' eyes, and Louÿs' open and sympathetic celebration of lesbian sexuality earned him sensation and historic significance.

Background

In 1894 Louÿs, travelling in Italy with his friend Ferdinand Hérold, grandson of the composer (1791–1831) of the same name, met André Gide, who described how he had just lost his virginity to a Berber girl named Meriem in the oasis resort-town of Biskra in Algeria; Gide urged his friends to go to Biskra and follow his example. The Songs of Bilitis are the result of Louÿs and Hérold's shared encounter with Meriem the dancing-girl, and the poems are dedicated to Gide with a special mention to "M.b.A", Meriem ben Atala.

Basic structure

The Songs of Bilitis are separated into three cycles, each representative of a phase of Bilitis' life: Bucolics in Pamphylia—childhood and first sexual encounters, Elegies at Mytilene—indulgence in homosexual sensuality, and Epigrams in the Isle of Cyprus—life as a courtesan. Each cycle progresses toward a melancholy conclusion, each conclusion signalling a new, more complex chapter of experience, emotion, and sexual exploration. Each of these melancholy conclusions is demarcated by a tragic turn in Bilitis' relationships with others. In the first stage of her life, Bucolics, she falls in love with a young man but is then raped by him after he comes upon her napping in the woods; she marries him and has a child by him, but his abusive behavior compels her to abandon the relationship. In the second stage (Elegies) her relationship with her beloved Mnasidika turns cold and ends in estrangement, prompting her to relocate once again. Finally, in the Epigrams in the Isle of Cyprus, despite her fame she finds herself longing for Mnasidika. Ultimately she and her beauty are largely forgotten; she pens her poems in silent obscurity, resolute in her knowledge that "those who will love when [she is] gone will sing [her] songs together, in the dark."

One of Louÿs' technical accomplishments was to coincide Bilitis' growing maturity and emotional complexity with her changing views of divinity and the world around her—after leaving Pamphylia and Mytilene, she becomes involved in intricate mysteries, moving away from a mythical world inhabited by satyrs and Naiads. This change is perhaps best reflected by the symbolic death of the satyrs and Naiads in "The Tomb of the Naiads".

Bilitis 
Louÿs dedicated a small section of the book to the fictional character of Bilitis, whom he invented for the book's purpose. He claimed she was a courtesan and contemporary of Sappho, and the author of the poems he translated. He went so far as to not only outline her life in a biographical sketch, but also to describe how her fictional tomb was discovered by a fictional archeological expedition, and include a list of additional, "untranslated", works by her.

Influence

Like the poems of Sappho, those of The Songs of Bilitis address themselves to Sapphic love. The book became a sought-after cult item among the 20th-century lesbian underground and was only reprinted officially in the 1970s. The expanded French second edition is reprinted in facsimile by Dover Books in America. This second edition had a title page that read: "This little book of antique love is respectfully dedicated to the young women of a future society."

In 1955 the Daughters of Bilitis was founded in San Francisco as the first lesbian civil and political rights organization in the United States. In regard to its name, Del Martin and Phyllis Lyon, two of the group's founders, said "If anyone asked us, we could always say we belong to a poetry club."

Adaptations
Louÿs' close friend Claude Debussy in 1897 musically set three of the poems—La flûte de Pan, La chevelure and Le tombeau des Naïades—as songs for female voice and piano. The composer returned to the collection in a more elaborate fashion in 1900, creating Musique de scène pour les chansons de bilitis (also known as Chansons de bilitis) for recitation of twelve of Louÿs' poems. These pieces were scored for two flutes, two harps and celesta. According to contemporary sources the recitation and music were accompanied by tableaux vivants as well. Apparently only one private performance of the entire creation took place, in Venice. Debussy did not publish the score in his lifetime, but later adapted six of the twelve for piano as Six Epigraphes Antiques in 1914.
Claude Debussy's Chansons de Bilitis received its first performance on February 7, 1901 in Paris. Based on poems by Pierre Louys, this piece is scored for two flutes, two harps and celesta but is different from another work of the same name by Debussy, which is a group of songs. Today's performance includes narrator and mime; Debussy later incorporates the music into his Six Epigraphes Antiques for piano duo.
In 1932 Roman Maciejewski set some poems to music as well.
Joseph Kosma wrote the 1954 comédie musicale (or operetta) Les chansons de Bilitis for soloists and piano.
Michael Findlay and Roberta Findlay made a 1966 sexploitation film titled Take Me Naked which features narrated passages from The Songs of Bilitis. In the film, the main character is shown in bed reading the collected works of Pierre Louÿs. He then has a series of erotic dreams depicting nude or scantily dressed women while a female voice narrates passages of the Bilitis poetry.
The 1977 French film Bilitis, directed by David Hamilton and starring Patti D'Arbanville and Mona Kristensen, was based on Louÿs' book, as stated in the opening credits. It concerns a twentieth century girl and her sexual awakening, but the British magazine Time Out said that, "surprisingly, a strong hint of Louys' erotic spirit survives, transmitted mainly through the effective playing and poise of the two leading characters."
More recently Songs of Bilitis, a play adapted from the poems by Katie Polebaum with music by Ego Plum, was performed by Rogue Artists Ensemble under a commission from the Getty Villa in Los Angeles.

Translations 
The book was translated to Polish twice, in 1920 by Leopold Staff and in 2010 by Robert Stiller.

English translations: 
Horace Manchester Brown in 1904.  "Privately printed for members of The Aldus Society" (https://openlibrary.org/books/OL24152668M/The_songs_of_Bilitis)
Alvah C. Bessie in 1926.  "Privately printed for subscribers" (https://www.sacred-texts.com/cla/sob/sob000.htm)
H.M. Bird in 1931.  Argus Books.
J. Rolf in 2013.

Illustrations
The Songs of Bilitis has been illustrated extensively by numerous artists.

The most famous illustrator to grace the collection with his drawings was Louis Icart, while the most famous illustrations were done by Willy Pogany for a 1926 privately circulated English language translation: drawn in an art-deco style, with numerous visual puns on sexual objects.

Other artists have been Georges Barbier, Edouard Chimot, Jeanne Mammen, Pascal Pia, Joseph Kuhn-Régnier, Sigismunds Vidbergs, Pierre Leroy, Alméry Lobel Riche, Suzanne Ballivet, Pierre Lissac, Paul-Emile Bécat, Monique Rouver, Génia Minache, Lucio Milandre, A-E Marty, J.A. Bresval, James Fagan and Albert Gaeng from Geneva.

See also
 1894 in poetry
 Lyric poetry
 Prose poetry

References

External links
 The Songs of Bilitis, full text of 1926 English translation by Alvah C. Bessie
 Rogue Artists Ensemble's theatrical adaptation The Songs of Bilitis
 Debussy's Trois Chansons de Bilitis performed by Sasha Cooke (mezzo-soprano) and Pei-Yao Wang (piano) at the Isabella Stewart Gardner Museum in MP3 format

1894 books
French poetry collections
Literary forgeries
Erotic poetry
LGBT literature in France
Ancient Greece in art and culture
Ancient Greek erotic literature
1890s LGBT literature
Works by Pierre Louÿs
LGBT poetry